The 2008 World Outdoor Bowls Championship men's triples was held at the Burnside Bowling Club in Christchurch, New Zealand, from 12 to 24 January 2008.

Wayne Hogg, Willie Wood and David Peacock of Scotland won the gold medal.

Section tables

Section A

Section B

Finals

Results

References

Men